Tellis Burthorne Ellis Jr. (May 26, 1912 – March 15, 2000) was an American football and basketball coach.  He was the head football coach at Jackson State University in Jackson, Mississippi. He led the Tigers to a 24–21–3 record from 1946 to 1951 before being replaced by future College Football Hall of Fame coach John Merritt. He was educated at Morehouse College and Boston University.

A gymnasium and the football training facility on JSU's campus are named in his honor.

References

1912 births
2000 deaths
Jackson State Tigers and Lady Tigers athletic directors
Jackson State Tigers football coaches
Jackson State Tigers basketball coaches
Morehouse College alumni
Boston University alumni
People from Vicksburg, Mississippi
Coaches of American football from Mississippi
Basketball coaches from Mississippi
20th-century African-American sportspeople